Peyman Keshavarzi (born March 6, 1995) is an Iranian footballer who plays as a defender for Azerbaijan Premier League side Kapaz PFK.

Career 
He started at the academy of Iranian team Tractor Sazi, before being promoted to the first team in 2014. He played 1 game for the first team, before joining Machine Sazi in 2016. In total, he spent 5 year playing in Iran with Tractor Sazi, Machine Sazi, Esteghlal Ahvaz, and Gostaresh Foulad F.C., before joining Azerbaijani team Sumgayit in 2019. He joined  Sabail FK in June 2020.

On March 16, 2021, he rejoined Tractor SC.

Club career statistics 
Last Update: 30 March 2021

Honours 
Tractor Sazi
 Persian Gulf Pro League: 2014-15 (Runner-Up)

Sumgayit
 Azerbaijan Cup: 2018-19 (Runner-Up)

References

External links 
 
 
 
 
 
 
 Peyman Keshavarzi at PlaymakerStats.com
 Peyman Keshavarzi at 24live.co
 Peyman Keshavarzi at Persianleague.com

1995 births
Iranian footballers
Association football defenders
Iranian expatriate footballers
Tractor S.C. players
Machine Sazi F.C. players
Esteghlal Ahvaz players
Gostaresh Foulad F.C. players
Sumgayit FK players
Sabail FK players
Living people